Tanais is a genus of malacostracans in the family Tanaididae. There are about 11 described species in Tanais.

Species
These 11 species belong to the genus Tanais:
 Tanais dulongii (Audouin, 1826) i c g b
 Tanais gayi Nicolet, 1849 i c g
 Tanais grimaldii Dollfus, 1897 i c g
 Tanais loricatus Bate, 1864 i c g
 Tanais macrocheles Nicolet, 1849 i c g
 Tanais nuwalianensis Tzeng & Hsueh, 2014 c g
 Tanais pongo Bamber, 2005 c g
 Tanais portiatius i g
 Tanais tenuicornis (Haswell, 1882) i
 Tanais tinhauae Bamber and Bird, 1997 i c g
 Tanais vanis M. A. Miller, 1940 i c g
Data sources: i = ITIS, c = Catalogue of Life, g = GBIF, b = Bugguide.net

References

Tanaidacea
Malacostraca genera
Taxa named by Pierre André Latreille
Articles created by Qbugbot